is a fishing video game for the Dreamcast and Nintendo 64 only in Japan.

Development and release
It was released in April 2000 for Nintendo 64, and an upgraded version called Bass Rush was released in December 2000 on Dreamcast.

Gameplay
Bass Rush: ECOGEAR PowerWorm Championship is a bass fishing game with 6 real lakes, more than 10 types of fish, and 124 types of both hard and soft lures, and virtual tournaments were held on the Internet with monthly rankings to allow players to compete in real time, and collect points for catching fish in mini-games. The game utilized the VMU and fishing controller. The game featured two playable characters, a man and a woman.

Reception
Eric Bratcher reviewed the Dreamcast version of the game for Next Generation, rating it one star out of five, and stated that "we love fishing games, but we can't think of a single reason to own this one."

Dreamcast Magazine rated the game at 67%, Famitsu rated it at 65%, and Dorimaga rated it at 82%.

References

2000 video games
Dreamcast games
Fishing video games
Japan-exclusive video games
Nintendo 64 games